Pontiac High School can refer to:

In Canada:
 Pontiac High School (Quebec)

In the United States:
 Pontiac High School (Michigan)
 Pontiac Township High School, Illinois